Likith Shetty (born 27 February 1989) is an Indian actor, who works in the Kannada film industry. He started his career as a television anchor in 2007.

Career
Likith Shetty started his career by anchoring television shows in 2007, but he always desired to be an actor. He started his journey into acting and completed a diploma in theatre from Navarasa school of Art, Bangalore. He made his film acting debut in "Parole" in 2010 directed by Rajshekar. His next film was Oriyardori Asal in Tulu where he played the hero; it was a hit and ran for 300 days. Along with this he also started being an anchor for many TV shows. He has also worked in Nam Duniya Nam Style, Madime and Sankashta Kara Ganapathi. In 2011, he acted in his debut leading role in 'Oriyardori Asal' (Tulu) movie.

Films

Television career

References

Living people
1989 births
Indian male film actors
Male actors from Karnataka
Actors from Karnataka